Axel Schulz (20 May 1959) is a former German footballer.

Club career 
He played 250 matches in the East German and (unified) German top-flight for Hansa Rostock. He was part of the last East German champion and cup winner side in the 1990/91 season.

International career 
Schulz won three caps for the East Germany national team.

Coaching career 
He coached the women's team of Polizei SV Rostock.

Career after pro times 
Among other tasks he was also the spokesperson for FC Hansa after his career.

References

External links
 
 
 
 

1959 births
Association football midfielders
German footballers
East German footballers
East Germany international footballers
Living people
FC Hansa Rostock players